

Louis Marin (22 May 1931 – 29 October 1992) was a French philosopher, historian, semiotician, and art critic.

He was born in La Tronche, France. He is a French post-structuralistic thinker. He attended the University of Paris, Sorbonne and graduated with a Licence in Philosophy in 1952. His degree was followed in 1953 with an Agrégé in Philosophy and with a Docteur d'Etat in 1973. Marin taught at the University of Nanterre, Paris from 1967 to 1970, the University of California, San Diego from 1970 to 1974, Johns Hopkins University from 1974 to 1977, and finally at the École des Hautes Études en Sciences Sociales in Paris from 1977 to 1992. He was also an Associate of the Humanities Center at Johns Hopkins University from 1985 until his death in 1992 in Paris. Marin was widely known for his work in a variety of areas: linguistics, semiotics, theology, philosophy, anthropology, rhetoric, art, and institutional history and literary theory. Throughout his career, Marin's main intellectual focus was seventeenth-century French literature and art, particularly the works of Blaise Pascal, Perrault, Nicolas Poussin, and Philippe de Champaigne. In addition, he published numerous articles on the visual arts, religious texts and utopias.

Education
 1950 Admission to the Ecole Normale Superieure 2
 1952 Degree in philosophy at the Sorbonne
 1953 Aggregation of Philosophy
 1973 Doctorate of State

Life
 1961–1964 Cultural Counsellor at the Embassy of France in Turkey
 1964–1967 Director of the French Institute in London
 1967–1970 Professor at the University of Paris-Nanterre and the EBU of Plastic Arts of Paris 1-Panthéon-Sorbonne
 1970–1974 University of California, San Diego
 1974–1977 Professor of French Literature at the Johns Hopkins University
 1978 Director of studies at the Ecole des Hautes Etudes en Sciences Sociales (EHESS)
 1987 Director of the Centre for the Arts and language EHESS-CNRS

Works
Marin has written on the following topics:

 Classicism and modernity
 Signs of power, authority signs
 Semiology of painting
 Autobiography
 Utopias and utopian spaces

Influence
Louis Marin has a lesser reputation than some of his contemporaries and friends, such as Jacques Derrida, Jean-François Lyotard and Michel de Certeau. Still, his classes and his work have exerted a profound influence on certain historians (Christian Jouhaud), art historians (Daniel Arasse), and literary historians (Hélène Merlin-Kajman, Joan DeJean).

References 
 Guide to the Louis Marin Offprints, 1975–1999
 Revision Required - apologies

1931 births
1992 deaths
People from La Tronche
20th-century French philosophers
French literary critics
French literary theorists
École Normale Supérieure alumni
Academic staff of the School for Advanced Studies in the Social Sciences
Poststructuralists
French art historians